Toscano, Tuscano, Toscana, Toscani or Toscanelli may refer to:

Places
"of Tuscany" or "Tuscan", used as an adjective
Magliano in Toscana, a comune in Italy
Toscano (Miami), Florida, United States

People
Alberto Toscano (born 1977), cultural critic, social theorist, philosopher and translator
Amy Toscani (born 1963), American sculptor
Anton Toscani (1901–1984), Dutch race walker
Aradia di Toscano, famous witch
Francis Anthony "Bud" Toscani (1909-1966), American football player
David Toscano (born 1950), American politician
Elisabeth Toscani (1761–1799), German actress
Gianluca Toscano (born 1984), Italian footballer
Giovanni Francesco Toscani (1372–1430), painter
Joseph Toscano (born 1952), Australian anarchist
Juan Toscano (born 1993), Mexican basketball player
Juan Carlos Toscano Beltran, Andorran footballer
Marcelo Toscano (born 1985), Brazilian football (soccer) player
Milena Toscano (born 1984), Brazilian actress
Odoardo Toscani (1859-1914), Italian painter
Oliviero Toscani (born 1942), photographer
Paolo dal Pozzo Toscanelli (1397–1482), mathematician
Peterson Toscano (born 1965), gay activist
Pia Toscano (born 1988), singer and American Idol contestant
Piero Toscani (1904–1940), boxer
Salvador Toscano (1872–1947), Mexican film-maker
Toscano (wrestler) (born 1973), Mexican professional wrestler

Science
96086 Toscanos, an asteroid belt
Toscana virus, a virus
Toscanelli (crater), lunar crater

Sports
Giro di Toscana, annual bicycle race
Toscana Open Italian Federation Cup, golf tournament

Music
Cieli di Toscana, a 2001 music album
Paesaggi toscani, rhapsody for orchestra

Other uses
Isabella Toscano, fictional character in soap opera
Lega Nord Toscana, political party
MS SNAV Toscana, cruise ferry
Palais Toskana, palace in Vienna
Toscano (bread) or Pane sciocco
Toscano (cigar), Italian cigars
Toscana (wine)

See also
Etruscan (disambiguation)
Tuscan (disambiguation)
Tuscany (disambiguation)

Italian-language surnames
Italian toponymic surnames
Ethnonymic surnames